Ekaterina Alexandrovna Sheremetieva (born 26 August 1991) is a Russian former pair skater. With Mikhail Kuznetsov, she is the 2007 ISU Junior Grand Prix Final silver medalist.

Career 
Sheremetieva teamed up with Mikhail Kuznetsov in 2003.

Sheremetieva broke her foot in 2006 and, as a result, the pair missed most of the 2006–2007 season. Although they placed third on the day, Sheremetieva/Kuznetsov were later awarded the silver medal from the 2007–08 ISU Junior Grand Prix Final following the retroactive disqualification of Vera Bazarova / Yuri Larionov due to a positive doping sample from Larionov. Sheremetieva/Kuznetsov made their senior international debut at the 2008 Nebelhorn Trophy, placing 5th. They missed part of the 2008-2009 season due to injury. Their partnership ended following that season.

Sheremetieva teamed up with Egor Chudin and competed with him for one season.

Personal life 
Sheremetieva's brother is a competitive judoka.

Programs 
(with Kuznetsov)

Competitive highlights

With Chudin

With Kuznetsov

References

External links

 
 
 Ekaterina Sheremetieva / Mikhail Kuznetsov at Tracings.net

Russian female pair skaters
1991 births
Living people
Figure skaters from Moscow